Chokhatauri is a district of Georgia, in the region of Guria. Its largest city and administrative centre is Chokhatauri.

Population
The population of the municipality is 19 001 people (2014); Density - 23.03 people / sq. km. Georgians live there. The majority of the population is Gurians, as well as Adjarans. A large part of the population is Orthodox Christian, a certain part - Muslim. There are 62 settlements in the municipality: 1 small town and 61 villages.

Politics
Chokhatauri Municipal Assembly (Georgian: ჩოხატაურის საკრებულო, Chokhatauri Sakrebulo) is a representative body in Chokhatauri Municipality consisting of 36 members which are elected every four years. The last election was held in October 2021. Davit Sharashidze of Georgian Dream was elected mayor. 

Chokhatauri Municipality includes the following territorial units: Chokhatauri, Amagleba, Bukistsikhe, Gogolesubani, Goraberezhouli, Guturi, Dablatsikhe, Didi Vani, Erketi, Zomleti, Zemo Surebi, Zemokheti, Zoti, Kokhnari, Nabetshabi, Nabetshabi Surebi, Jvartskha, Khevi, Khidistavi.

Economy

Leading fields are agriculture, including fruit growing, grain farming, viticulture, animal husbandry. JSC Margebeli JSC (Nabeghlavi Mineral Water Bottling Plant) is an important enterprise in the municipality, with Bakhmaro and Nabeghlavi mountain-climatic resorts.
The municipality is 296 km away from the capital, 24 km away from Ozurgeti, and 25 km away from the nearest railway junction. Samtredia-Kobuleti - 25 km section passes through the territory of the municipality.

Education and Culture
There are 31 public and 1 private school in the municipality, art (music, art) schools, student-youth house, libraries and museums: Niko Berdzenishvili Local Lore, Niko Mari, Mose Gogiberidze, Nodar Dumbadze, Eristavi Palace.

Tourist attractions

 Tamar Castle (Bukistsikhe)
 Erketi Convent (Erketi)
 Eristavi Palace (Goraberezhouli)
 Desert Monastery (middle elevation)
 Ghomi Castle (Zoti)
 St. George Church in Shuban

Villages in the district
Villages in the Chokhatauri district include:
Bukistsikhe
Chaisubani
Chokhatauri
Dablatsikhe
Didivani
Erketi
Ganakhleba
Gogolesubani
Goraberezhouli
Guturi
Khevi
Khidistavi
Kokhnari
Kvenobani
Nabeghlavi
Partskhma
Sachamiaseri
Shuaganakhleba
Shuasurebi
Vazimleti
Zemokheti
Zemosurebi
Zoti 
Janeuli

See also 
 List of municipalities in Georgia (country)

References

External links 
 Districts of Georgia, Statoids.com
 chokhautari.ge - Chokhatauri Municipality's official web site

Municipalities of Guria